Assyrian Church may refer to:

 Chaldean Catholic Church, an Eastern Christian church founded by and composed of ethnic Assyrians entered into communion with Rome.
 Assyrian Church of the East, an Eastern Christian church.
 Ancient Church of the East, an Eastern Christian denomination founded in 1968
 Assyrian Evangelical Church, a Presbyterian church in the Middle East.
 Assyrian Pentecostal Church, a Reformed Eastern Christian denomination
 Russian Ecclesiastical Mission in Urmia, a Russian Orthodox mission to ethnic Assyrians.

See also
 Assyrian (disambiguation)
 Assyrian Orthodox Church (disambiguation)
 Syriac Orthodox Church
 Syriac Catholic Church
 Chaldean Catholic Church